Through the Fire is a 2018 French drama film directed by Frédéric Tellier and released on 28 November 2018. The title is the motto of the Brigade of firefighters of Paris. The film stars Pierre Niney and Anaïs Demoustier.

Plot
The film was inspired by real events. Franck, a firefighter since the age of eighteen, is happy in his job and lives in his barracks with his companion. One day, while he is responding to an emergency, he sacrifices himself for his men and wakes up in a hospital burn victims unit. The film follows his journey trying to get  his life back to normal.

Cast
Pierre Niney as Franck
Anaïs Demoustier as Cécile
Vincent Rottiers as Martin
Sami Bouajila as Dr Almeida
Chloé Stefani as Nathalie
Damien Bonnard as Marlo
Élisabeth Commelin as Franck's mother
Calypso Buijtenhuijs as Caporal Fameaux

References

External links

2018 films
2010s French-language films
2010s French films